Megan Lisa White (born 30 July 1980) is an Australian former cricketer who played primarily as a right-arm medium bowler. She appeared in one One Day International for Australia in 1999, against New Zealand. She played domestic cricket for Queensland, Victoria, Brisbane Heat and Cheshire.

References

External links
 
 
Megan White at southernstars.org.au

Living people
1980 births
Australia women One Day International cricketers
Queensland Fire cricketers
Victoria women cricketers
Brisbane Heat (WBBL) cricketers
Cheshire women cricketers